Richard F. Zirk (1936 – April 26, 2014) was an American heavyweight weightlifter who won a silver medal at the 1961 World Championships.

A resident of Fairfield Township, Essex County, New Jersey, Zirk graduated from Grover Cleveland High School (since renamed as James Caldwell High School) in 1954, which inducted him into its hall of fame in 1997. After retiring from competitions Zirk worked for the Verona Public Schools. He was married for 57 years to Lorraine Zirk (née Korlishin), and had three children: Richard Zirk, Deborah Ruggieri, and Karen Summers.

References

1936 births
2014 deaths
American male weightlifters
James Caldwell High School alumni
People from Fairfield Township, Essex County, New Jersey
Sportspeople from Essex County, New Jersey
20th-century American people
21st-century American people